Barbara Chiappini (born 2 November 1974) is an Italian model, showgirl and actress.

Life and career 
Born in Piacenza, Chiappini  studied violin for four years at the conservatory of her city.   In 1993 she won the beauty contest  "An Italian for Miss World" and she subsequently entered the Miss World competition, winning the title of "Miss Photogenic". The same year, she made her television debut as a regular in the variety show Buona Domenica. She was active on fotoromanzi and appeared in three sexy calendars in 2002, 2003 e 2004. She participated in the soap opera Un posto al sole and to the first edition of the Raidue reality show L'Isola dei Famosi. She is also active in films, TV-series and on stage.

References

External links 
 

Italian film actresses
Italian television actresses
Italian stage actresses
1974 births
People from Piacenza
Living people
Participants in Italian reality television series
Miss World 1993 delegates
Italian beauty pageant winners